Lynsey DuFour is an American television soap opera writer.

Positions held
All My Children
Script Writer: 2009

Keeping up with the Kardashians
Story Editor

The Young and the Restless
Script Editor: October 2007 - December 24, 2007
Associate Head Writer: 2007 - December 24, 2007
Breakdown Writer: January 2007 - 2007
Script Writer: September 2006 - January 2007
Production Staff : 2004 – August 2006

Daytime Dish
Talk show about soap operas that was created in the spring of 2003 by Erica Meyer and Lynsey DuFour. Previous hosts include Hadley Klein and Katie Pelton.

Awards and nominations
Writers Guild of America Award
 Nomination, 2006 season, Best Writing, The Young And The Restless (Lynn Marie Latham, Kay Alden, John F. Smith, Scott Hamner, Josh Griffith, Sally Sussman Morina, Sara A. Bibel, Paula Cwikly, Jim Houghton, Trent Jones, Natalie Minardi Slater, Lynsey DuFour, Janice Ferri Esser, Eric Freiwald, Marc Hertz, Bernard Lechowick, Joshua McCaffrey, Linda Schreiber, Sandra Weintraub, and Sherman Magidson.)
Daytime Emmy Award
 Nomination, 2006 season, Best Writing, "The Young And The Restless"

External links
SunJournal

Year of birth missing (living people)
Living people
DuFour
American screenwriters
Daytime Emmy Award winners
Soap opera producers
American television producers
American women television producers
American women television writers
Place of birth missing (living people)
Women soap opera writers
21st-century American women